Stenberg is a surname that was the 11,945th most common last name in the United States as of the 2000 census.  One origin nationality for the surname is Swedish, though it was not uncommon for Swedish immigrants to the United States to change this surname to Stoneberg.  According to the "Dictionary of American Family Names", this is a Swedish ornamental surname meaning "stone mountain" (or "stone hill" in Danish or Norwegian).

19th Century
Lisette Stenberg (1770–1847), Swedish actress and musician
Ulla Stenberg (1792–1858), Swedish damask maker

20th Century
Birgitta Stenberg (1932–2014), Swedish author, translator and illustrator
Brigitta Stenberg, American actress
Dick Stenberg (1921–2004), Swedish Air Force lieutenant general
Don Stenberg (b. 1948), American politician
Eira Stenberg (b. 1943), Finnish playwright and poet
Gaby Stenberg (1923–2011), Swedish actress
Georgii Stenberg (1900–1933), Russian artist and designer
Hans Stenberg (b. 1953), Swedish politician
Henry Wuorila-Stenberg (b. 1949), Finnish expressionist and surrealist artist
Jan Stenberg, Swedish businessman
Johnny Stenberg (1925–1990), Norwegian politician
Karin Stenberg (1884–1969), Swedish Sami activist and teacher
Kurt Stenberg (1888–1936), Finnish Olympic gymnast
Leif Stenberg (b. 1969), Swedish Muslim scholar
Logan Stenberg (b. 1997), American football player
Ragnar Stenberg (1887–1954), Finnish athlete
Scott Stenberg (b. 1958), American aerospace engineer/executive, businessman, U.S. Patent holder
Sirið Stenberg (b. 1968), Faroese politician
Trine Stenberg (b. 1969), former Norwegian footballer
Vladimir Stenberg (1899–1982), Soviet artist and designer

21st Century
Amandla Stenberg (b. 1998), American actress
Jeremy Stenberg (b. 1981), American freestyle Motocross rider
Lennart Stenberg, Swedish author of Den nya nordiska floran

Lillo-Stenberg
Lars Lillo-Stenberg (b. 1962), Norwegian musician
Per Lillo-Stenberg (1928–2014), Norwegian actor

See also
Stenberg v. Carhart, a Supreme Court case that ruled laws against partial birth abortions to be illegal
Stenborg

Notes